(La) Rinascente is a collection of high-end stores with Italian and international brands in fashion, accessories, beauty, homeware, design, and food. It operates eleven stores in Italy, including its general headquarters in Milan and two flagship stores in Rome.

It was a member of the International Association of Department Stores from 1959 to 2008, with various CEOs acting as presidents of the association over time.

Origin 
In 1865, brothers Luigi and Ferdinando Bocconi opened in Via Santa Radegonda, Milan the first shop in Italy that sold ready-to-wear clothing. By the following year, they employed over a hundred workers to manufacture ready-to-wear suits for men. Between 1872 and 1876, they set up branches in Via del Corso in Rome as well as in Genoa, Trieste, Palermo, and Turin.  In 1877 they opened the department store Aux Villes d'Italie ("To the Cities of Italy") at the Hotel Comfortable. This was the first of its kind in Italy, and was conceived following the model of Aristide Boucicaut's store, Le Bon Marché in Paris, made famous by Émile Zola in his 1883-novel Au Bonheur des Dames. In 1880, the store took the Italianized name Alle città d'Italia, and in 1887 a new store designed by Giulio De Angelis opened in Rome in Piazza Colonna. In 1889, the new building of Piazza Duomo designed by Giovanni Giachi opened its doors in Milan.

The company owned by Senator Borletti and the upturn of the 1920s 
In 1917, Senator Borletti purchased the company from the Bocconi Brothers and commissioned poet Gabriele D'Annunzio to find a new name.  His suggestion was Rinascente, a name to convey the idea of the 'rebirth' of the store which was officially registered on 27 September 1917. Borletti's objective was to make elegance the distinctive character of the department store by committing himself to higher quality merchandise without excessively raised prices. The official goal was a "democratic" approach to luxury that would attract customers of both high and middle-low income classes.
 
A few days before the grand opening, on Christmas night of 1918, fire destroyed the store in Milan in Piazza Duomo. Between 1919 and 1920 the stores in Turin, Genoa, Bologna, Florence, Rome, Naples, and Palermo were revamped. Over the years, other stores opened: Padua (1923), Catania (1923), Messina (1924), Bari (1925), Piazza Loreto in Milan, Corso Vittorio Emanuele in Rome, Taranto, Syracuse, and Trapani (all between 1927 and 1928).

The store in Piazza Duomo reopened on 23 March 1921 after it had been completely rebuilt, transformed, and expanded to include a variety of additional services such as a bank, a hair salon for women and men, a tearoom with an orchestra, and a post office. The well-known poster created by Aldo Mazza for the reopening of the store depicted a burnt trunk of an olive tree with new green sprouting branches, and was a symbolic reference to the concept of rising from the ashes.

In the 1920s, important architects and designers like Gio Ponti worked with their in-house designers in a furniture laboratory to design new modern furniture for the Rinascente customer. 

Majority stakeholder Senator Borletti entrusted the daily operation of the company to the hands of Umberto Brustio, his son-in-law. During these years Rinascente established and strengthened its business relationship with Marcello Dudovich. The Trieste-born artist would go on to create advertising posters for the company until 1956.

The 1930s 

In 1928, after collaborating with the German-based company Leonhard Tietz to introduce a store with fixed pricing in Italy, la Rinascente merged with UPIM to create a new company. This new enterprise had a new partner, namely the department store Jelmoli in Zurich, and consisted of 5 Rinascente and 25 UPIM stores around Italy. In 1937, the Piazza Colonna store in Rome installed the first escalator in a retail outlet in Italy. These were the years in which many Made in Italy products were launched and soon became popular all around. Prominence was given to synthetic fabrics such as rayon, cafioc (artificial hemp) and artificial wool, which all took centre stage. At this time Rinascente launched campaigns to promote products manufactured by Italian companies and created strong ties through its distribution network with consumers thus catering for the needs of the general public. After Senator Borletti's death in 1939, Umberto Brustio was appointed president of the company. In 1941, the National Clothing Association declared la Rinascente as a leader in the retail market since its sales area in square metres was double that of Standa and Coin put together. The following year the company celebrated its 25th anniversary and counted 5 Rinascente and 52 UPIM stores.

The World War II years 
The company suffered great losses during World War II. The stores in Genoa and Cagliari were completely destroyed. On 16 August, the store in Piazza Duomo was practically razed to the ground; only one Rinascente store in Rome and 37 UPIM stores around Italy were still partially operational. The City Council of Milan allowed la Rinascente to rent three large rooms in the Palazzo della Ragione in Via Mercanti so that it could keep supplying the general public with goods.

The post-war recovery and the splendour of the 1950s 
After the war, there was a rapid and vigorous recovery. Between 1945 and 1946 a rebuilding project included 19 UPIM stores, la Rinascente in Cagliari, the Head Office in Via Carducci, Milan as well as the warehousing facilities. On 4 December 1950, the Rinascente store in Piazza Duomo opened its doors once again in great style. The façade of the building had been designed by Ferdinando Reggiori. Carlo Pagani was responsible for designing the store windows, entrances as well as the interior design and furnishings. Modern escalators connected the different floors of the building. Max Huber created the new logo while Albe Steiner was in charge of external and internal promotional fixtures and graphics until 1955. These were years of great turmoil and during this time Rinascente sold a great many innovative products imported mainly from the US and promoted a series of cultural events, which gave the public a glimpse of what was happening around the world. Countries featuring in these dedicated events included Spain (1955), Japan (1956), Great Britain (1957), the USA (1958) India and Thailand (1959), Mexico (1960) and a special event to promote the culture of the Indios in 1964. 1955 saw the inauguration of the new 'Circolo della Rinascente' located in Via Durini, Milan and the setting up of a PR office; while an office for market research was created in 1957. Lora Lamm was in charge of advertising graphics while Amneris Latis was the Art Director of the advertising department.

In 1957, after 40 years, Umberto Brustio left his top management position and was nominated Honorary President. Aldo Borletti, Senator Borletti's son, was elected President and together with Cesare and Giorgio Bustio he also acted as Managing Director. One of the leading figures within top management was Cesare Bustio, Managing Director and Vice President.

The "Compasso d'Oro" award

This prize was awarded for the best industrial production and for those designers that in creating everyday objects knew how to combine aesthetics with functionality. , who got the idea from one of his own work instruments, created the logo of the award while it was left to Alberto Rosselli and Marco Zanuso to design the actual compass given as a prize. In 1959, Rinascente gave control of the award to the Association for Industrial Design (ADI) that had been founded in 1956. The Compasso d'Oro grew to become the highest honour in the field of industrial design in Italy, comparable to other prestigious international awards such as the Good Design award, iF Design Award, Red Dot Award, the Cooper-Hewitt National Design Awards, and the Good Design Award (Japan).

1960s Growth 
In 1960, in addition to Rinascente-UPIM stores, the company expanded its operations by creating the Sma supermarkets chain. These stores followed the model of the first Italian supermarket, which opened in Milan in Viale Regina Giovanna on 27 November 1957. This was an example of more modern and advanced distribution and retailing of foodstuffs and groceries. It was the year of the economic boom and during the Christmas period, there was such a great influx of customers that the Rinascente store in Milan was at times forced to block the entrances owing to overcrowding.

Also in that year, Rinascente opened a new store designed by Franco Albini and Franca Helg in Piazza Fiume, Rome. It extended over 7 floors linked by lifts, escalators and the famous spiral staircase designed by Albini. It held 50 sales departments displaying all the themes and ranges that so characterised the Milan branch. In this way, Rinascente became the most complete shopping destination in Rome.

In 1963, noted French fashion designer Pierre Cardin signed a contract with la Rinascente to create a line of moderately priced garments, declaring that the latest fashion pieces should be accessible to all, democratic and in step with the times.  Adriana Botti Monti became the Art Director of the Advertising department. Numerous prizes and professional awards marked her career.

1969: acquisition by FIAT Group 
In 1967, after Aldo Borletti's death, the newly appointed president of the group was Senator Borletti (the son of one of the founder's brothers) and Cesare Brustio was the CEO. In 1969, the Borletti family sold its shareholdings to IFI and Mediobanca which held shares since 1965 when Jelmoli left the company. In 1970, Ambassador Guido Colonna di Paliano was appointed president of the company. The group now owned 5 Rinascente stores, 150 UPIM stores and 54 Sma supermarkets.
In 1972 Rinascente – Città Mercato opened in Brescia as the first hypermarket selling at bargain prices. The aim of the new company's management was to overcome the contrast between the large retail sector and traditional retail. The retail outlet in Piazza Duomo was refurbished and the new organisation of Rinascente became more rational and in line with the times. In 1973, the company opened a new store in Turin. Umberto Brustio died on 25 April 1972 and Senator Borletti became Vice President on 23 March 1973.

In 1977, the group acquired one of the largest American retailers: JC Penney with 4 stores in Lombardy. Rinascente pushed for a bigger market share, sustained by all the experience in its retail network as well as a modern and successful business organisation. The result was a 20.7% increase in sales in the first semester. In 1983 the group opened the first Italian Bricocenter, a DIY store, in Turin. Two years later the negotiations were successfully concluded for the purchase of Croff Nuova SpA, a company specialising in the distribution of homeware. In 1997 Fiat Estates stipulated a financial and technical agreement with Auchan, resulting in the gradual conversion of the 23 'Città Mercato' and the 2 'Joyland' to the Auchan brand. The group closed with an increase in turnover and developed new strategies to reach the objective of strengthening the food sector by opening 40 hypermarkets by 2002.

Sale to Associated Investors Group 
Following the split of the Group in 2005, the department stores of Rinascente were taken over by a group of investors (20% Pirelli Real Estate, 46% Associated Investors, 30% Deutsche Bank Real Estate, 4% Borletti family) and La Rinascente S.p.A. was set up. Vittorio Radice was at the helm of the management team. This signalled the beginning of an important period of change: the aim being to reposition the brand upmarket thus increasing its value. This was achieved by means of restructuring and updating all stores and upgrading the type of products available. The complete renovation of the store in Piazza Duomo included the addition of an extremely cosmopolitan Food Hall in 2007 and in 2009 the Design Supermarket taking up a whole floor with over 200 brands on display.

Acquisition by Central Retail Group
In May 2011 the Thailand-based Central Retail Corporation, purchased Rinascente for €290 million. Sudhitham Chirathivat became president with Tos Chirathivat as director of Rinascente. During a press conference, Tos Chirathivat announced that he wanted to make the brand Rinascente famous at a global level and well–known all over Asia. The following year Alberto Baldan, General Manager since 2007, was appointed CEO. Vittorio Radice took on the role of Vice President charged with the international development of the luxury stores within the group. In 2013, Central Group purchased department store ILLUM in Copenhagen and in 2015 it reached an agreement with Sigma for the acquisition of the majority shareholding of the KaDeWe Group thus acquiring the KaDeWe store in Berlin, Oberpollinger in Munich and Alsterhaus in Hamburg. On 26 May 2016 Rinascente Milan received the award as the best department store in the world during the ceremony in Zurich of the Global Department Store Summit 2016.

A second flagship store in Rome 
In October 2017, Rinascente opened a second Rome flagship store to its base. This new store occupies a refurbished 8-storey building in Via del Tritone, Rome. The most extraordinary feature is the archaeological site that can be visited on floor −1. The site brings to light the remains of the Aqua Virgo aqueduct dating back to 19 BC. The store also incorporates a small building dating back to the 1900s called the 'Palazzetto'. The Food Hall, found on the top floor, gives visitors the chance to admire fantastic 360-degree views over the rooftops of the capital.  Originally scheduled to open in 2012, but was delayed several times. The store was in development and construction for 11 years and cost a total of €200 million.

References

 La Rinascente at core of CRC's global ambition

Retail companies of Italy
Companies based in Milan
Italian companies established in 1865
Department stores of Thailand

Retail companies of Thailand
Compasso d'Oro Award recipients